Banjo on My Knee is a 1936 American musical comedy-drama film directed by John Cromwell. The film was nominated for an Academy Award in the category Sound Recording (Edmund H. Hansen).

Plot
Ernie Holley runs away on his wedding night because he thinks he has killed a wedding guest. His father Newt and his bride Pearl find him in New Orleans and persuade him to come home.

Cast
 Barbara Stanwyck as Pearl Elliott Holley
 Joel McCrea as Ernie Holley
 Walter Brennan as Newt Holley
 Buddy Ebsen as Buddy
 Helen Westley as Grandma
 Walter Catlett as Warfield Scott
 Tony Martin as Chick Bean (as Anthony Martin)
 Katherine DeMille as Leota Long (as Katherine De Mille)
 Victor Kilian as Mr. Slade
 Minna Gombell as Ruby
 Spencer Charters as Judge Tope
 Theresa Harris (uncredited) singer on dock

References

External links
 
 
 
 

1936 films
1936 drama films
1936 comedy films
1930s musical comedy-drama films
American musical comedy-drama films
American black-and-white films
20th Century Fox films
Films based on American novels
Films directed by John Cromwell
Films with screenplays by Nunnally Johnson
1930s English-language films
1930s American films